The Church of Christ in China Yenching College, or CCC Yenching College, Yenching College in short is a co-education secondary school in Nga Ying Chau of Tsing Yi Island, Hong Kong. The school is managed by The Hong Kong Council of the Church of Christ in China.

The secondary school was founded by alumni and teaching staff from Yenching University in Peking after the campus and some alumni was forced to incorporate in Peking University by Mao Zedong's Communist Party of China in 1952. The founders hoped that the school would restore to the university someday.

In 1977, they reused an old building of South Sok Uk Government Primary School and established a secondary school in So Uk Estate. They named it Yenching College. In September 2000, it was moved to current premises in Nga Ying Chau, adjacent to Villa Esplanada. The old campus was passed to Vocational Training Council School of Business and Information Systems (職業訓練局工商資訊學院), namely nowadays Vocational Training Council Youth College.

List of Supervisors
 Pastor Wang Peter (1977-1984)
 Pastor Li Qing (1984-1985)
 Pastor Guo Naihong (1985-1988)
 Pastor Weng Shuguang (1988-1993)
 Dr. Su Zongren (1993)
 Pastor Wu Zhenzhi (1993-1994)
 Pastor Hu Bingjie (1995-1997)
 Pastor Lu Hui (1997-2003)
 Dr. Zhang Yunyun (2003-2008)
 Dr. Li Jinchang (2008-2013)
 Mr. Xu Junyan (2013-2019) [term of office until 31 August 2019]
 Pastor Pu Jinchang (2019-2021)

List of Principals
 Ms. Wang Manhua (1977-2008)
 Mr. Tan Bingyuan (2008-15 May 2013)
 Mr. Liang Dahui (16 April – 15 May 2013, Acting)
 Mr. Liang Guoji (16 May 2013 – 31 August 2016)
 Ms. Xia Lizhu (1 September 2016-)

Co-curricular activities
The school has more than 40 organizations, including service groups, uniform groups, sports school teams, art groups, interest groups and academic groups. All S1 students must participate in at least one activity to develop their interests, skills, interpersonal skills and leadership skills. Secondary 1 students are also required to participate in uniform teams to develop students' sense of responsibility, discipline and service. Unity groups include Boy Scouts, St. John Ambulance (girl students only), Aviation Youth League, traffic safety team and bagpipes. In addition, the Student Union also holds secretarial meetings and delegate meetings. All students are divided into four clubs, each of which organizes a series of activities to develop students' rational and independent thinking and collaboration skills.

External links

Tsing Yi
Hong Kong Council of the Church of Christ in China
Yenching University
Educational institutions established in 1977
1977 establishments in Hong Kong
Protestant secondary schools in Hong Kong